Joanneum so named after Habsburg Archduke Johann of Austria may refer to:

Museum 
 Universalmuseum Joanneum

University of applied sciences 
 FH Joanneum

Non-academic research institute 
 Joanneum Research